Fiber to the Edge (FTTE), fiber to the telecom enclosure (FTTTE), fiber to the zone (FTTZ), or fibre to the cabinet (FTTC) in the UK, is a networking approach used in the enterprise building (hotels, convention centers, office buildings, hospitals, senior living communities, Multi-Dwelling Units, stadiums, etc.). It is a standards-compliant structured cabling system architecture that extends the optical fiber backbone network from the equipment room directly to a telecommunications enclosure (TE), access node, ONT, or media converter installed in a common space to serve a number of users or devices in a nearby area.

In other words, fiber reaches directly from the main distribution frame of a building out to the edge devices, eliminating or reducing the need for intermediate distribution frames.

Implementation 
Its implementation is based on the TIA-569-B “Pathways and Spaces” technical standard, which defines the Telecommunications Enclosure (TE), and TIA/EIA-568-B.1 Addendum 5, which defines the cabling when a TE is used. The FTTE architecture allows for many media choices from the TE to the work area; it may be balanced twisted pair copper, multi-mode optical fiber, or even wireless if an access point is installed in or near the TE.

Depending on the user’s needs, FTTE can be deployed in low-density or high-density configurations. A low-density system might use one or two inexpensive 8-port Ethernet mini-switches as an example (these switches have eight 10/100 Mbit/s Ethernet copper ports and one 1 Gbit/s Ethernet fiber uplink). 

A high-density FTTE design might use commonly available 24- or 48-port switches (these switches are configured with one 1 Gbit/s uplink port per twelve 100BASE-TX user ports). This relatively high work area-to-backbone port ratio provides better performance than is typically provided to enterprise users. Both low and high-density FTTE architectures provide excellent performance in terms of bandwidth delivered to the work area.

Pros and cons 
Advantages
Low Cost
Non-blocking or low-blocking performance better supports convergence
Extremely flexible to deploy; supports Moves, Adds & Changes
Enables consolidation of electronics into a centralized Telecommunications Room
Allows the use of a variety of media from the TE to the user
Disadvantages
TE location is near the user and must be secured

See also 
BICSI
Fiber in the loop
Fiber to the x
Fiber-optic communication
Hybrid fibre-coaxial
Network architecture

References

External resources 
TIA Fiber Optic Standardization Subcommittees 
Fiber Optics LAN Section of the Telecommunications Industry Association
Fiber Optics Association

Telecom enclosure
Local loop